Judith Ellen Melick (born June 4, 1954) is an American former competition swimmer who participated as part of the U.S. team at the 1972 Summer Olympics.

A 17-year-old resident of the Somerset section of Franklin Township, Somerset County, New Jersey, Melick was the youngest of 13 Olympians heading to Munich in 1972.

A 1972 graduate of Rutgers Preparatory School, Melick represented the United States at the 1972 Summer Olympics in Munich, Germany.  She swam the breaststroke leg for the gold medal-winning U.S. team in the preliminary heats of the women's 4×100-meter medley relay, but was ineligible to receive a medal under the 1972 rules because she did not compete in the event final.  Individually, she also competed in the women's 100-meter breaststroke, finishing fifth in the event final with a time of 1:16.34.

Melick later attended Rutgers University in New Brunswick, New Jersey, where she became the first female swimmer to receive an athletic scholarship.  She competed for the Rutgers Scarlet Knights swimming and diving team, even before the university had formed its separate women's swimming team, training and traveling with the men's team before becoming the first captain of the women's swimming team when it was established in 1976.

She later graduated from Harvard Medical School.

See also
 List of Rutgers University people

References

External links
 

1954 births
Living people
American female breaststroke swimmers
Olympic swimmers of the United States
People from Franklin Township, Somerset County, New Jersey
Sportspeople from Somerset County, New Jersey
Sportspeople from Summit, New Jersey
Rutgers Preparatory School alumni
Rutgers Scarlet Knights women's swimmers
Swimmers at the 1972 Summer Olympics
Harvard Medical School alumni